The Shreveport Shockhers was a professional American football team that played during the 2006 season as part of the National Women's Football Association. They played their home games in Shreveport, Louisiana.

The team finished with a 1–7 record in their lone season.

References

ShockHers
2006 establishments in Louisiana
2006 disestablishments in Louisiana